Avril Phali (born 17 August 1978) is a South African professional footballer who plays for Jomo Cosmos, as a goalkeeper.

Club career
Phali has played for Sebokeng Black Rhinos, Vaal Ambassadors, Jomo Cosmos and Orlando Pirates. After Cosmos were relegated from the Premier Soccer League in the 2009–10 season, Phali announced he would remain with the club. The next season, Phali won the National First Division title with the Cosmos. In July 2011, Jomo Sono announced that he wanted Phali to become the Cosmos' goalkeeping coach after he retired.

References

1978 births
Association football goalkeepers
Living people
South African soccer players
Orlando Pirates F.C. players
Jomo Cosmos F.C. players
People from Vereeniging
2006 Africa Cup of Nations players
Soccer players from Gauteng